The 2021 BWF World Championships (officially known as the  TotalEnergies BWF World Championships 2021 for sponsorship reasons) was a badminton tournament which took place from 12 to 19 December 2021 at Palacio de los Deportes Carolina Marín in Huelva, Spain.

Host city selection
Huelva was awarded the event in November 2018 during the announcement of 18 major badminton event hosts from 2019 to 2025.

Schedule
Five events were held.

All times are local (UTC+1).

Medal summary

Medal table

Medalists

Players

Number of participants

Players participating in two events

Performance by nation

 Some players/pairs started in the second round or the third round as a result of receiving a bye in the first round and or second round.

Note

References

External links
Official website

 
BWF World Championships
International sports competitions hosted by Spain
Badminton tournaments in Spain
Sport in Huelva
BWF World Championships
BWF World
BWF